The Recherche was a 20-gun Marsouin-class scow of the French Navy, later reclassified as a 12-gun frigate. She earned fame as one of the ships of Bruni d'Entrecasteaux' expedition, along with Espérance. Both Recherche Bay, Tasmania and the Recherche Archipelago, Western Australia were named after her.

Career 
The ship was built as Truite and served under this name until July 1791, when she was renamed to Recherche and recommissioned as a 12-gun frigate.

She departed from Brest on 29 September 1791 for an exploration mission in search of Lapérouse, sailing to New Caledonia. Bruni d'Entrecasteaux died aboard on 21 July 1793.

Fate 
On 28 October 1793, Recherche was captured by the Dutch at Surabaya, only to be returned to France in February 1794. She was sold to Holland in September and sold for scrap two months later.

Sources and references 
 Jean-Michel Roche, Dictionnaire de la flotte française de 1671 à nos jours, Tome I, p. 372

See also
 European and American voyages of scientific exploration

Exploration ships
1787 ships